David Corydon Walden (June 7, 1942April 27, 2022) was an American computer scientist who contributed to the engineering development of the ARPANET, a precursor of the modern internet. He specifically contributed to the Interface Message Processor, which was the packet switching node for the ARPANET. Walden was a contributor to IEEE Computer Society's Annals of the History of Computing and was a member of the TeX Users Group.

Early life and education 
Walden was born on June 7, 1942, to Velva (née Diede) and Clarence Walden in Longview, Washington. His mother was an elementary school teacher while his father was a high school teacher. His family moved to San Francisco Bay Area in California when he was aged four. He started out at University of California, Berkeley, before dropping out with poor grades and subsequently moving to San Francisco State University, where he obtained a degree in Mathematics. While at San Francisco State University, he took a course in numerical analysis, a field of mathematics, that triggered his interest in computers, and he worked on an IBM 1620 computer, the university's only computer.

Career 

Walden started his career working as a programmer at the space communications division of Massachusetts Institute of Technology's Lincoln Laboratory. He moved to join Bolt Beranek & Newman (BBN) in 1967. It was here that he was part of the seven-member engineering team that developed the packet switching technology that powered the ARPANET, one of the first general purpose computer networks that was a precursor of the modern internet. During his time at BBN, the group of engineers developed the Interface Message Processor, that formed the packet switching basis for the network, developed the hardware, wrote the software, and even acted as the Network Operations Center for the network. Specifically, Walden's efforts focused on developing the packet switching and routing software for the IMP. Walden briefly moved to Norway to work at Norsk Data Elektronikk in Oslo, developing the LFK network, a Norwegian packet switching network, between 1970 and 1971, before returning to the United States to continue working with BBN. Walden was the system architect and Norsk Data's project manager in building out this network.

Toward the latter part of his career, Walden focused on management research and wrote extensively on the topic. He was also a member of the TeX Users Group and contributed to content related to digital typesetting and publishing. He had also served as the group's director and treasurer. Walden received a honorary doctorate from the San Francisco State University in 2014, for his contributions to the ARPANET. Walden was the co-founder of Center for Quality of Management and a contributor to IEEE Computer Society's Annals of the History of Computing and a member of its History Committee.

Personal life 
Walden married Sara Elizabeth Cowles, an educational administrator, in 1966. The couple had a son. Walden died of mantle cell lymphoma at his house in East Sandwich, Massachusetts, on April 27, 2022. He was aged 79.

Select publications

References

External links 
 
 David Walden FamilyCollection of Resources
 David Corydon Walden's Five Careers - biography done by his longtime co-worker, Alexander A. McKenzie, for the IEEE Annals of the History of Computing

1942 births
2022 deaths
Computer scientists
Deaths from cancer in Massachusetts
Deaths from non-Hodgkin lymphoma 
People from Longview, Washington
San Francisco State University alumni
Scientists from Washington (state)